La Quinta, also known as Quinta, Quinto, and Poblado la Quinta is a small town and ward (consejo popular) home of 1,026 in Camajuani, Villa Clara, Cuba. Nearby towns are Romano, La Mano, Piedra, Aguijón, Matilde Blanquizal, and La Flora.

History 
Until 1976 La Quinta was a part of San Antonio de las Vueltas Municipality.

Education 
La Quinta has one school, which is: 
 Andrés Cuevas Primary

Economy
According at the DMPF of Camajuani, La Quinta is a settlement linked to sources of employment or economic development. 

The Provincial Tobacco Company La Estrella has territory in La Quinta, Camajuani,  Aguada de Moya, San Antonio de las Vueltas, and Taguayabón.

Infrastructure 
In La Quinta, Taguayabón, San Antonio de las Vueltas, and Vega de Palma there are a combined total of 13 Municipal Collection Establishment squares. There is also one Twisted Factory in La Quinta and an egg hatchery, with the person owning the egg hatchery being Carlos Quintanal Feito.

See also
 Aguada de Moya, Cuba
 La Luz, Cuba
 Vega Alta, Cuba
 Canoa, Cuba

References 

Populated places in Cuba
Populated places in Villa Clara Province